Manakhah District is a district of the Sana'a Governorate, Yemen. As of 2003, the district had a population of 78,932 inhabitants.

References

Districts of Sanaa Governorate
Manakhah District